Serra dos Órgãos National Park (: "Organs Range") is a national park in the state of Rio de Janeiro, Brazil. It protects the Serra dos Órgãos mountain range and the water sources in the range. It was the third national park to be created in Brazil.

Location

The Serra dos Órgãos National Park is located about a one-hour drive from the city of Rio de Janeiro.
The BR-116 highway leads through the park.
The origin of the unusual name is credited to early Portuguese settlers who thought the ensemble of the hill tops resembled the pipes of organs in European cathedrals.
The park is part of the larger Serra do Mar chain of mountains, and the most accepted theory about its origin is that it rose about 60 million years ago during earthquakes that caused the Andes to rise. That means it is located in a geologically unstable location, although no incident has ever been recorded in the area. 

The most famous formation in the park is the Dedo de Deus (God's Finger) peak, which resembles a left hand with its index finger stretched, pointing towards the sky.

History

The Serra dos Órgãos National Park was created on 30 November 1939 as the third national park in Brazil.
The purpose of the park was to protect the headwaters of the rivers that flow into the Fluminense basin, and to protect the spectacular mountains.
It covered parts of the municipalities of Magé, Petrópolis and Teresópolis.

Various buildings and other infrastructure were built in the 1940s such as the natural swimming pool, administrative buildings, warehouses, garage, staff quarters and four shelters on the Trilha do Sino (Bell Trail). The park had about 250 employees, including waiters in the mountain shelters.
In the 1960s, with the national capital transferred from Rio de Janeiro to Brasilia, the park lost funding and the facilities were allowed to deteriorate. The shelters and some of the staff homes were lost.

Efforts were made to restore the park from 1980, including publication of the management plan and purchase of land to regularize the park's tenure.
In the 1990s the municipality of Guapimirim was split off from Magé, and also contains the biggest part of the park.
From the 1990s the old buildings have been restored and new ones built.
The park was included in the Central Rio de Janeiro Atlantic Forest Mosaic, created in 2006.

Environment

The climate is tropical superhumid, with 80% to 90% relative humidity caused by moist air from the Atlantic most of the year.
The south east side facing the ocean receives more rain than the north west side.

The park is in the Atlantic Forest biome, and due to the high rainfall has rich vegetation, much of it unique to this biome.
More than 2,800 species of plant have been recorded including 360 of orchids and over 100 bromeliads.
Up to  the lower slopes are covered by typical lowland rainforest.
From  the vegetation is montane forest, with significant variations depending on the conditions in each area.
The understory has shrubs and the outcrops are populated by ferns and mosses.
There are various endemic species.
Above  the vegetation is high montane, with open fields and small woody shrubs.
347 species have been found in this environment of which 66 are endemic to this ecosystem.
The park is one of the few natural habitats of species of Schlumbergera, which were developed into the colourful "Thanksgiving Cactus" and "Christmas Cactus", widely grown as house plants.

References

Sources

External links

Orgaos
National parks of Brazil
Protected areas established in 1939
Protected areas of Rio de Janeiro (state)
1939 establishments in Brazil
Protected areas of the Atlantic Forest